The 1978 World Fencing Championships were held in Hamburg, West Germany. The event took place from July 12 to July 22, 1978, and was held at Alsterdorfer Sporthalle.

Medal table

Medal summary

Men's events

Women's events

References

FIE Results

World Fencing Championships
F
F
1978 in West German sport
1970s in Hamburg
1978 in fencing
July 1978 sports events in Europe
Sports competitions in Hamburg